The 1826 United States elections occurred in the middle of Democratic-Republican President John Quincy Adams's term. Members of the 20th United States Congress were chosen in this election. The election took place during a transitional period between the First Party System and the Second Party System. With the Federalist Party no longer active as a major political party, the major split in Congress was between supporters of Adams and supporters of Andrew Jackson, who Adams had defeated in the 1824 Presidential election.

In the House, Jackson supporters picked up several seats, taking the majority from the faction supporting Adams. Andrew Stevenson, a supporter of Jackson who would later join the Democratic Party, won election as Speaker of the House.

In the Senate, supporters of Jackson picked up one seat, retaining their majority.

See also
1826–27 United States House of Representatives elections
1826–27 United States Senate elections

References

 
1826
United States midterm elections